Reginald Vincent le Bas (26 July 1856 — 7 July 1938) was an English first-class cricketer, solicitor and barrister.

The son of the clergyman Henry Vincent le Bas, he was born in July 1856 at Friern Barnet, Middlesex. He was educated at Cheltenham College and became a solicitor after leaving Cheltenham. He made a single appearance in first-class cricket for the Marylebone Cricket Club (MCC) against Cambridge University at Fenner's in 1882. He was dismissed twice in the match for nought, by Robert Ramsay and C. Aubrey Smith respectively. le Bas later became a barrister, passing the bar exam in October 1894 and gaining admittance as a barrister to Lincoln's Inn. le Bas died in July 1938 at Winsford, Somerset. His nephew was the British Army officer and cricketer Montagu Brocas Burrows.

References

External links

1856 births
1938 deaths
People from the London Borough of Barnet
People educated at Cheltenham College
English solicitors
English cricketers
Marylebone Cricket Club cricketers
Members of Lincoln's Inn
English barristers